Bi Namad (also Romanized as Bī Namad and Bīnamad) is a village in Emamzadeh Abdollah Rural District, Dehferi District, Fereydunkenar County, Mazandaran Province, Iran. At the 2006 census, its population was 593, in 164 families.

References 

Populated places in Fereydunkenar County